Girl Scouts of the United States of America (GSUSA), commonly referred to as simply Girl Scouts, is a youth organization for girls in the United States and American girls living abroad. Founded by Juliette Gordon Low in 1912, it was organized after Low met Robert Baden-Powell, the founder of Scouting, in 1911. Upon returning to Savannah, Georgia, she telephoned a distant cousin, saying, "I've got something for the girls of Savannah, and all of America, and all the world, and we're going to start it tonight!"

Girl Scouts prepares girls to empower themselves and promotes compassion, courage, confidence, character, leadership, entrepreneurship, and active citizenship through activities involving camping, community service, learning first aid, and earning badges by acquiring practical skills. Girl Scouts' achievements are recognized with various special awards, including the Girl Scout Gold, Silver, and Bronze Awards.

Girl Scout membership is organized according to grade, with activities designed for each level. GSUSA is a member of the World Association of Girl Guides and Girl Scouts (WAGGGS) and accepts girls of all backgrounds.

A 1994 Chronicle of Philanthropy poll showed Girl Scouts ranked by the public as the eighth "most popular charity/non-profit in America" among more than 100 charities. It describes itself as "the world's preeminent organization dedicated solely to girls."

History

Girl Guides of America 

Girl Scouting in the United States began on March 12, 1912, when Juliette "Daisy" Gordon Low organized the first Girl Guide troop meeting of 18 girls in Savannah, Georgia. It has since grown to a peak of 3.7 million members. Low, who had met Baden-Powell in London while she was living in the United Kingdom, dreamed of giving the United States and the world "something for all the girls." She envisioned an organization that would bring girls out of their homes to serve their communities, experience the out-of-doors, and have the opportunity to develop "self-reliance and resourcefulness." From its inception, the Girl Scouts has been organized and run exclusively for girls.

Juliette Gordon Low was the granddaughter of Juliette Magill Kinzie and John Harris Kinzie, whose childhood family was one of the earliest settlers of Chicago, IL. Juliette Kinzie wrote about her experiences in the Northwest Territory (now the state of Wisconsin) in her book Wau-Bun: The Early Day. Some of what her granddaughter, Juliette Gordon Low, knew firsthand about her grandmother's experiences on the frontier were incorporated into the beginnings and traditions of Girl Scouts. The early home of Juliette Low's grandparents can be visited May 15 through October 15 in Portage, Wisconsin.

In late 1912, Low proposed that the Camp Fire Girls merge with the Girl Guides but was rejected in January 1913 as Camp Fire was then the larger group. Next, Low attempted to merge her organization with the Girl Scouts of America which was founded in Des Moines, Iowa by Clara Lisetor-Lane. She thought their similarities would make this easier but Lisetor-Lane felt Daisy copycatted her organization and threatened to sue. Lisetor-Lane later claimed Low's organization was luring members away but the GSA's growth was limited by a lack of financial resources which led to its eventual demise.

Girl Scouts of the United States

The Girl Guides of America in 1913 changed its name to Girl Scouts of the United States and moved its headquarters to Washington, D.C. In 1915 the organization was incorporated and the national headquarters was moved to New York City. The name reached its current form, Girl Scouts of the United States of America, in 1947. The organization was given a congressional charter on March 16, 1950.

GSUSA started with 18 members. Within months, members were hiking through the woods in knee-length blue uniforms, playing basketball on a curtained-off court, and going on camping trips. In 1916, Low established an aviation badge—even before women could vote. By 1920, there were nearly 70,000 members. By 1923 the organization had branches in every state in the union, Alaska, Hawaii, and Puerto Rico, and a total membership of 125,738. In 1930 it had over 200,000. In 2013 there were over 3.2 million Girl Scouts: 2.3 million girl members and 890,000 adult members in the United States. More than 50 million American women have participated in Girl Scouts. Through its membership in WAGGGS, GSUSA girls and adults are among over 10 million members in 146 countries.

The names and ages of the levels and the larger structure of the program have changed significantly over time. In 1923 Girl Scouts were organized into patrols, troops, local councils, and the National Council. Troops were initially fairly independent before joining together into small councils, which recently merged to form larger councils. Today there are over 100 councils across the U.S.

The Juliette Gordon Low Birthplace, located in Savannah, Georgia, in the former Gordon family home, became the national Girl Scout program center in 1956. It provides tours to thousands of Girl Scouts yearly. Upon Low's death in 1927, she willed her carriage house, which would eventually become The Girl Scout First Headquarters, to the local Savannah Girl Scouts for continued use. In 1923 national headquarters was located at 189 Lexington Avenue, New York.

World War II
During World War II, 1943–1945, many young Japanese American girls were confined in internment camps with their families. Girl Scout troops were organized, even in these camps. These girls participated in many activities, including dramatic presentations that took place in the Crystal City Internment Camp in Crystal City, Texas.

Desegregation
Most Girl Scout units were originally segregated by race according to state and local laws and customs. The first troop for African American girls was founded in 1917; the first American Indian troop was formed in New York State in 1921; and the first troop for Mexican Americans was formed in Houston, Texas, in 1922. In 1933, Josephine Groves Holloway founded unofficial African American troops in Tennessee. She also fully desegregated the Cumberland Valley council in 1962. The first official African American troop in the South was founded in 1932 in Richmond, Virginia by Lena B. Watson and led initially by Lavnia Banks, a teacher from Armstrong High School. It first met in Hartshorn Hall at Virginia Union University.

By the 1950s, GSUSA had begun significant national efforts to desegregate the camps and maintain racial balance. One of the first desegregations, accomplished by Murray Atkins Walls in 1956, was Camp Shantituck in Kentucky. Later the same year, Martin Luther King Jr. described Girl Scouts as "a force for desegregation". In 1969, a national Girl Scout initiative called Action 70 was created that aimed to eliminate prejudice. Gloria D. Scott, an African American, was elected national president of Girl Scouts in 1975.

Wing Scouts

The Wing Scout program was a Senior Girl Scout program for girls interested in flying and wanting to serve their country that started in 1941 and ended in the 1970s. In July 1942, 29 troop leaders from 15 states met in Philadelphia, Pennsylvania, to take Wing Scout leadership training. They returned to their councils and began setting up Wing Scout troops. In 1959, the Girl Scout council in North San Mateo County, California, was presented with an offer from United Airlines San Francisco Management Club President J. L. Burnside to start an aviation program for Senior Girl Scouts. One of the highlights of the Wing Scout program was the courtesy flight provided to Senior Girl Scouts using United Airlines' jets. For many of the girls, this was the first time they had flown in a plane. Senior Girl Scouts who had been in the program for three years were given the opportunity to take over the controls during flight in a small aircraft. The program was discontinued after United Airlines experienced financial setbacks in the 1970s.

Age levels

The program was originally for girls ages 10 to 18, but it was subsequently divided into three levels. Brownies (for younger girls) was based on a program developed in England in 1914 and was officially recognized in the mid-1920s. At the same time, girls over 18, or over 16 if First Class Scouts, became known as Senior Scouts. In 1938, the age divisions were: Brownies (ages 7 through 9), Intermediates (ages 10 through 13), and Seniors (ages 14 through 18).

In 1965 the age structure was rearranged to Brownies (ages 7 and 8, or 2nd and 3rd grades), Juniors (ages 9 through 11, or 4th through 6th grades), Cadettes (ages 11 through 14, or 7th through 9th grades), and Seniors (ages 14 through 18, or 10th through 12th grades). In the early 1970s, the Brownie level was extended to girls six years old or in the first grade, and the Daisy program for kindergarten girls or those age five was introduced in 1984. The Daisy program began as a pilot program called Pixies in 1976.

In 2003, the Studio 2B program for girls ages 11 to 17 was introduced for Cadettes and Seniors. Studio 2B allowed girls to call themselves by any name of their choosing, including but not limited to "Studio 2Bs," "teen Girl Scouts," or Cadettes and Seniors. Under the Studio 2B programs, girls were able to work on traditional badges as well as Studio 2B activities, and the Silver Award and Gold Award requirements were rewritten to require both. Studio 2B activities differed from badges in two ways: each booklet focused on a topic such as environmentalism or self-confidence rather than being skill-based like a badge; and to earn each Studio 2B charm, the Girl Scout had to choose activities from the booklet and then meet a goal relevant to the booklet topic. She would create her own plan for achieving her goal, following a basic planning procedure called SMART (specific, measurable, attainable, realistic, timely).

On October 1, 2008, all levels were renamed to have "Girl Scout" as the beginning of their name, e.g., Girl Scout Brownies instead of Brownie Girl Scouts, and all levels are by grade only instead of by age or grade. A new level, Girl Scout Ambassadors, was created for girls in grades 11 and 12 (around 16 to 18 years old), with Girl Scout Seniors to be only in ninth and tenth grade (around 14 to 16 years old), and sixth grade girls were reclassified from the Junior level to Cadette to conform with school grade levels. (By this time, sixth grade was considered a middle school rather than an elementary school grade.) The new levels were tried in approximately six councils in spring 2008 and were put to use nationally after October 1, 2008.

Although troop membership has always and is still the most common way to participate in Girl Scouting, girls who do not have a local troop, or who do not desire or have the time to participate in traditional troop activities, can still sign up as individual Girl Scouts. Individual Girls Scouts were known in the early years of Girl Scouting as Lone Scouts and later as Juliettes; they attend activities independently and work individually on badges and awards. In 2001, Stefanie Argus, an eighth-grade student, created Juliettes, an official designation for independent Girls Scouts, as her Silver Award Project. "I wanted to create something to tell other girls who left their troops they belong to the Girl Scouts," Argus said. In 2015–2016, the term Juliette was phased out at the national level, in favor of the term Independent Girl Scouts, although some councils still use the term Juliette.

Mariner Scouts
The 20th National Council of GSUSA launched the Mariner Girl Scout program in October 1934. Similar to the Boy Scouts of America's Sea Scouting, the program was designed for older Girl Scouts interested in outdoor water-based activities. By the end of 1934, 12 Mariner ships were registered and the first two handbooks, Launching a Girl Scout Mariner Ship and Charting the Course of a Girl Scout Mariner Ship, were published. The Mariner Girl Scout program remains active but in a smaller form; most girls have instead joined Sea Scouting, which has been coed since 1971.

Special programs
There are programs for girls in very unusual situations that make it difficult for them to participate in the standard given programs. The Girl Scouts "Beyond Bars program" helps daughters of incarcerated mothers connect with their mothers and helps mothers participate in Girl Scout activities. Another program, Girl Scouting in Detention Centers, allows girls who are themselves in detention centers to participate in Scouting. Other initiatives try to help girls in rural areas or in public housing. There are also programs for American girls living overseas.

Organizational structure

The national organization has its central headquarters in New York City. It is headed by a chief executive officer and a 40-member national board of directors. Sofia Chang currently serves as the chief executive officer, and was officially appointed in January 2022. The president of the National Board of Directors, the highest volunteer position, is Karen P. Layng.

Below the national organization are councils, which cover a large portion of a state or geographic region. Some councils own and run camps for the troops within their area of responsibility. Councils are usually subdivided into areas, called neighborhoods, service units, or associations (terms vary), which are program delivery areas that consist of troops at all age levels in a smaller area, such as a town.

The basic unit is the troop which may or may not be sponsored. In contrast to Boy Scout troop-chartered organizations, Girl Scout troop sponsors do not own the troop. Troops range in size from as small as 5 to as large as 30 or more girls and may be divided into several patrols of 8 or fewer girls.

Realignment
In 2004, Girl Scouts of the USA hired a consultant "to help Girl Scouts develop a strategy to ensure our future success and growth." They set targets and implemented ways to change the organization for the better. In addition, six "gap teams" looked at ways Girl Scouts could improve its structure to prepare for future growth and success of the organization. This followed declines in membership and in revenue, as well as challenges in subsidizing programs for inner-city girls. The governance gap team found that consolidation decreased confusion and provided economies of scale, and recommended an optimal council size of approximately 10,000 girls. As of 2006, there were 312 regional Girl Scout councils, which own the 236,000 local troops and other groups.

As part of a 2006 reorganization, the national board of directors consolidated the 312 councils into 109 councils.

This was not without resistance; the Manitou Girl Scout council in Wisconsin sued the national GSUSA in federal district court, alleging breach of the Girl Scout charter. Although the suit was summarily dismissed with prejudice by the district court, the Seventh U.S. Circuit of Appeals overturned that decision, stating that a Girl Scout council agreement "was no different than a Dunkin' Donuts franchise." The decision of the appeals court maintained the status of the Manitou council. As a result, there are 112 Girl Scout councils in the United States.

Insignia

Promise, Law, Motto, and Slogan
Promise

The Girl Scout Promise can be made in English, Spanish, or in American Sign Language with the same meaning.

On my honor, I will try:
To serve God and my country,
To help people at all times,
And to live by the Girl Scout Law

The Promise is often recited at Girl Scout troop meetings while holding up the three middle fingers of the right hand, which forms the Girl Scout sign. Girl Scout policy states that the organization does not endorse or promote any particular philosophy or religious belief. The movement is nonsectarian, founded on American democratic principles, one of which is freedom of religion. In this context, the word "God" may be interpreted by each Girl Scout depending on her individual spiritual beliefs, and Girl Scouts are free to substitute the word consistent with their beliefs, such as "Creator," "my faith," "Allah," etc.

The aim of Girl Scouts is to help girls pursue four goals: develop to their full potential; relate to others with increasing understanding, skill, and respect; develop a meaningful set of values to guide their actions and make sound decisions; and contribute to the improvement of society.

Law
I will do my best to be
honest and fair,
friendly and helpful,
considerate and caring,
courageous and strong, and
responsible for what I say and do,
and to
respect myself and others,
respect authority,
use resources wisely,
make the world a better place, and
be a sister to every Girl Scout.

The Girl Scout Law has been changed several times since 1912. The original Girl Scout Law written by Juliette Gordon Low was:

The Girl Scout Law
 A Girl Scout's honor is to be trusted
 A Girl Scout is loyal
 A Girl Scout's duty is to be useful and to help others
 A Girl Scout is a friend to all, and a sister to every other girl scout no matter to what social class she may belong
 A Girl Scout is courteous
 A Girl Scout keeps herself pure
 A Girl Scout is a friend to animals
 A Girl Scout obeys orders
 A Girl Scout is cheerful
 A Girl Scout is thrifty

Motto

Be prepared.

Slogan

Do a good turn daily.

Girl Scout uniforms

For girls ages 5 to 14, the unifying look includes wearing a choice of a tunic, vest, sash for displaying official pins and awards, combined with their own solid white shirts and khaki pants or skirts. Girl Scouts in high school can also wear a scarf that unites their look with the sisterhood of Girl Scouts around the world. For adult members the unifying look of the uniform is a Girl Scout official scarf or tie for men, worn with the official membership pins, combined with their own navy blue business attire. Girl Scouts at the Daisy and Brownie levels will continue to have a full uniform ensemble available.

Girl Scout uniforms have changed significantly over the years from the original navy blue in 1912, to khaki in 1914, to the familiar green. The evolution has included uniforms with the specificity to designate each age level of Girl Scouting. Since 2008, Girl Scouts at each level have one required element (tunic, sash or vest) for the display of official pins and awards which will be required when girls participate in ceremonies or officially represent the Girl Scout Movement.

For all levels, earned awards go on the front of the vest or sash following official placements. Fun patches can be displayed on the back of a vest or sash. Girl Scout Daisies can choose a blue vest or a smock with a full uniform or white shirt and khaki pants and skirt. They have their own Daisy pin and a choice of accessories. Girl Scout Brownies can choose a traditional brown vest or sash to be worn with the historic Brownie pin and other uniform pieces or white shirt and khaki pants or skirts. Girl Scout Juniors wear their official vest or sash to display insignia including awards, coupled with a white shirt and khaki pants or skirt. Girl Scout Cadettes, Seniors, and Ambassadors can choose a khaki sash or vest to go with khaki pants or skirt and a white shirt.

The adult uniform also changed, with registered women and men wearing navy blue business attire, again from their regular wardrobes. Also available for women are official sweaters and an insignia scarf, while men have the option of an official tie.

Logos
 The emblem designed by Juliette Low was the only emblem used for Girl Scout pins through 1980. At the 1978 GSUSA National Convention, the use of two logos was voted on, allowing Girl Scouts to pick which they wanted to wear as their Girl Scout pin (for Girl Scout Juniors and up).

The current Girl Scouts of the USA logo is a rejuvenation of the original logo based on Saul Bass' 1978 design, Bass being a graphic designer known for his motion picture title sequences and design of various other well known logos. In 2010, the hair and facial styles were updated by Jennifer Kinon and Bobby C. Martin, Jr. of The Original Champions of Design.

Activities and programs
One of the original and continuing attractions of Girl Scouts is that girls become proficient campers and participate in many outdoor activities such as canoeing or backpacking with their troops. Troops do service projects such as carrying out flag ceremonies, collecting food for food drives, visiting nursing homes, and Christmas caroling or other community services. Troops may also plan and take extended trips within the United States or even to another country. Troops may organize cultural or learning events such as first-aid training or attending live theater. The Girl Scout activity most familiar to the general public may be the annual sale of Girl Scout Cookies, which started in 1917 as a money-earning opportunity for councils and troops.

Girl Scouts and STEM
Girl Scouts has incorporated STEM-related programs and badges in order to encourage more interest in Scouts in STEM fields. From 2005 to 2007, more than 8.6 million STEM-related badges were earned. The first STEM-related Girl Scout badges, though, can be traced back to the 1913 Electrician and Flyer Badges. The first computer-related badges appeared in the 1980s. In 2001, The Girl Scout Research Institute, published a 36-page report about the need for more encouragement to get girls into the field of technology. An even larger push for STEM programs came after a 2012 study by the Girl Scout Research Institute reported that 74% of teenage girls were interested in courses in STEM subjects while only 25% of STEM industry jobs were held by women. Recent endeavors to encourage interest in STEM fields amongst Girl Scouts includes partnerships with companies like NASA, AT&T, and Lockheed Martin. NASA specifically paired the Girl Scouts with the SETI Institute to create a 5-year space education program called "Reaching for the Stars: NASA Science for Girl Scouts." The most recent push to help Girl Scouts imagine a future in STEM was the Girl Scout's appearance at the International Consumer Electronics Show in January 2016 to show off Digital Cookie 2.0, a website made in partnership with Dell and Visa, that helps Girl Scouts manage their cookie business online.

There are four Girl Scout FIRST Robotics Competition teams: Space Cookies Team 1868, Lady Cans Team Team 2881, Gadget Girls Team 4816, and Tin Mints Team 4574. The Space Cookies are based at NASA Ames Research Center and were the first all-girls team to reach the finals at FRC world championships. They are known for their extensive community outreach and work to expand menstrual equity and eliminate period poverty. The Space Cookies helped launch the Girl Scout STEM Pledge, a national initiative to reduce the gender gap in STEM fields by bringing millions of girls into the STEM pipeline.

Girl Scouts currently has 127 badges and journeys under the STEM category. In 2020, Girl Scouts announced the addition of 24 new badges in STEM, entrepreneurship, and leadership.

The Automotive, Coding for Good, Cybersecurity, Mechanical Engineering, and Robotics badges are all series of three awards that cover different areas in their respective topics. These badges can be earned separately, but are all related by the topic that they cover. Additionally, these badges mostly have the same name across levels, but have unique requirements for each level that get more complex and in-depth through the different age levels. 

In June 2017, Girl Scouts announced a partnership with Palo Alto Networks to create 18 cybersecurity badges by September 2018.

International convention
Every three years Girl Scouts holds an international convention, featuring voting on policies and procedures, as well as guest speakers and activities and events for upwards of 10,000 girls and Girl Scout alums. The 2020 convention was conducted virtually due to concerns about Covid-19, and the next convention will be held in 2023 in Orlando, Florida.

Destinations

Once known as "Wider Opportunities" or Wider Ops, Destinations are travel opportunities for individual older Girl Scouts. Destinations are held within the United States and in other countries. Destinations are primarily international, outdoor, science, people, or apprenticeship oriented, such as kayaking in Alaska, or career oriented such as learning about working for NASA.

A "Destination" may be a trip to one of the WAGGGS World Centres:

 Our Cabaña in Cuernavaca, Mexico
 Our Chalet in Adelboden, Switzerland
 Pax Lodge in London, England
 Sangam World Centre in Pune, India
Kusafiri in Africa

Traditions

The Girl Scouts of the USA have many customs and traditions: camping, community service, singing, and money earning to support their activities. The Girl Scout Handshake and the Girl Scout signal for silence are two shared by WAGGGS member organizations. Other traditions include the Friendship Circle with "the squeeze," taking bandanas and homemade sit-upons on camping trips, and the buddy system.

"Bridging" is the process of going from one level to another. Bridging is usually done at the troop level, although area bridgings are often held. The girls that are bridging walk across a bridge to their new level and are greeted with the Girl Scout Handshake. There is a notable bridging ceremony held in San Francisco, as GS Juniors bridge to GS Cadettes over the Golden Gate Bridge.

World Thinking Day and "Girl Scouts' Own" are traditions throughout the world of Girl Scouting. World Thinking Day has occurred annually since 1926 on February 22, the birthday of both Robert Baden-Powell and Olave Baden-Powell. On World Thinking Day, Girl Scouts and Guides around the world think about their sisters in other lands; Councils or local service units (associations) hold a celebration on or near this day, in which each participating troop gives a presentation of the culture and customs of a country selected by the troop. Many Girl Scouts in America celebrate Juliette Gordon Low's birthday on October 31, Founder's Day. The parties often include the girls dressing up in Halloween costumes, and serving birthday cake.

A "Girl Scouts' Own" is a special ceremony that expresses the spirit of Girl Scouting when the girls reflect upon their feelings about Girl Scouting and the world around them. A "Girl Scouts' Own" can have any theme, or none at all. It is a solemn time given for Girl Scouts to create a moment of their very own. It can be held at any time and include the girls' troop or be held at any inter-troop gathering.

Badges and other awards
All levels of Girl Scouts can earn badges. Each level has specific badges that can be earned. Daisies earn badges shaped like flowers. Brownies earn badges shaped like triangles. Juniors earn badges shaped like circles. Cadettes earn badges shaped like diamonds. Seniors earn badges shaped like rectangles. Ambassadors earn badges shaped like squares.

Earned Badges and Awards are worn on the front of a Girl Scout's vest (or sash). Fun Patches are worn on the back of the vest. Daisies wear blue vests. Brownies wear brown vests. Juniors wear green vests. Cadettes, Seniors, and Ambassadors wear khaki vests. For Cadettes, Seniors, and Ambassadors, a Girl Scout may choose wear the same khaki vest for all three levels. Active Girl Scouts, who earn a lot of badges, may opt to get a new khaki vest when they change levels so they have more room to display their awards.

Skill building badges

Journey awards
Each level of Girl Scouting has multiple Journey programs. A Journey is a series of lessons on a particular topic. The Journeys are made up of multiple parts and all parts of the Journey must be earned for it to be complete. A Girl Scout who completes three Journeys at one level earns a Summit Pin. Before beginning work on a Bronze, Silver, or Gold Award project, a Girl Scout must complete one Journey at her level. A Girl Scout who did not earn her Silver Award must complete two Journeys at her current level, instead of one, to work on her Gold Award.

Additional awards
Girl Scouts can earn other awards, usually represented by pins. Some of these awards are: Leadership Torch, Community Service Bar, Service to Girl Scouting Bar, Bronze Cross, Medal of Honor, Cookie Activity Pin, Safety Pin, My Promise My Faith Pin, Counselor in Training I & II, Volunteer in Training, World Thinking Day Award, and Global Action Award.

Girl Scouts can also earn and display on their uniform awards from outside organizations, such as the religious emblems from religious organizations, or the President's Volunteer Service Award.

Highest awards
The highest achievement in Girl Scouting is the Girl Scout Gold Award, which can only be earned by Girl Scout Seniors and Ambassadors. The highest award for Girl Scout Cadettes is the Silver Award, and Bronze Award is the highest award for Girl Scout Juniors. These awards require large-scale service projects showing leadership along with service hours.

The Gold Award is the highest honor a Girl Scout can earn. This award can be earned by Girl Scout Seniors and Girl Scout Ambassadors. This prestigious award represents a Girl Scout's dedication and commitment to Girl Scouting and to her community. Earning the Girl Scout Gold Award requires hard work and a willingness to take on significant responsibility. For many, the leadership and organizational skills and sense of community and commitment that come from earning the Gold Award set the foundation for a lifetime of active citizenship. The Gold Award project takes a minimum of 80 hours to complete.

The Silver Award, the highest honor a Girl Scout Cadette can earn, gives girls the chance to do big things and make their community better in the process. The Silver Award takes the participants through a seven-step process: identify an issue, build a Girl Scout Silver Award team, explore the community needs, choose a project, develop the project, make a plan, and put it into motion. The Silver Award project takes a minimum of 50 hours to complete.

The Bronze Award, the highest honor a Girl Scout Junior can earn, requires girls to learn the leadership and planning skills necessary to follow through on a project that makes a positive impact on her community. Working toward this award demonstrates a Girl Scout's commitment to helping others, improving her community and the world, and becoming the best she can be. The Bronze Award project takes a minimum of 20 hours to complete.

Adult recognition
There are also GS awards for adults including: Outstanding Volunteer, Outstanding Leader, Appreciation Pin, Honor Pin, Thanks Badge, and Thanks Badge II. Outstanding Volunteer is awarded for Outstanding service as Girl Scout volunteer (other than a leader). Outstanding Leader is awarded for Outstanding service as Girl Scout leader. Appreciation Pin is awarded for exceptional performance beyond expectations for the position. The Honor Pin recognizes an adult member who has delivered exceptional service beyond expectations to two or more geographic areas, service units or program delivery audiences in a way that furthers the council's goals. Thanks Badge recognizes outstanding service for a Council as a whole or the Girl Scout Movement as a whole. Different GS councils use different terminology for regions within their council. Thanks Badge II is awarded where the recipient has received the Thanks Badge and the recipient's service continues to merit further recognition. At least one nomination, two endorsements, and a review of the forms is required for each of these awards.

Effect on American life
Among the many famous American Girl Scouts are Dakota Fanning, Lucille Ball, Katie Couric, and Elizabeth Dole. Many Girl Scouts have become successful leaders in numerous professional fields such as law, medicine, politics, journalism, and science. Beginning with Lou Henry Hoover, the incumbent First Lady has served as the Honorary President of GSUSA. Lou Henry Hoover was also the actual President of the Girl Scouts from 1922 to 1925 and Chairman of the National Board of Directors from 1925 to 1928.

During World War I and World War II, girls involved in Scouts helped the Allied forces by selling defense bonds, growing victory gardens, and collecting waste fat and scrap iron. Girl Scouts also spread their values into their communities through community service projects such as soup kitchens and food drives.

Over twenty of NASA's female career astronauts were former Girl Scouts. The first American woman to spacewalk was a former Girl Scout, Dr. Kathryn Sullivan.

The American Girl
From 1917 until 1979 Girl Scouts published a magazine, originally called The Rally (1917–1920) and then The American Girl, with "The" later dropped. (It is not to be confused with the American Girl magazine 1992–2019.) Circulation exceeded 200,000 in the 1940s, and reached as high as 510,000 per month by 1949. At that time, the popular Seventeen had 2.5 million readers. At one time this magazine had the largest circulation of any magazine aimed at teen-aged girls.

Girl Scout Senior Roundups

International Girl Scout gatherings named Senior Roundups were held every three years from 1956 until 1965:
 Milford, Michigan (1956) attended by 5,000 girls
 Colorado Springs, Colorado, from July 3, 1959 to July 12, 1959, with 10,000 girls
 Button Bay, Vermont from July 18, 1962 to July 31, 1962, with 9,000 girls
 Farragut Reservation, Idaho, from July 17, 1965 to July 26, 1965, with 12,000 girls

Issues

Religion

Non-sectarian founding
When the Girl Scouts were first organized, the organization claimed to be "non-sectarian in practice as well as theory". By the early 1920s, Catholic Girl Scout units had been founded in New York, Philadelphia, Washington and other cities. In the 1920s, about 2,000 Girl Scouts were Catholic. During this time, the organization upheld standards which were consistent with the beliefs of the Catholic religion. From its founding in 1912, it had Jewish leaders and scouts.

"To serve God" in the Promise

Since 1993, Girl Scouts have been able to substitute something appropriate to their own beliefs for the phrase "To serve God" in the Girl Scout Promise. This option appears in the guidelines distributed to adult volunteers but not in the actual girls' books. Official volunteer documentation contains this note:

This note or a shorter variant also frequently appears on local council web pages.

Volunteers are reminded "to be sensitive to the spiritual beliefs of the girls in your group and to make sure that everyone in the group feels comfortable and included in Girl Scouting" and to feel free to share the policy with the girls' families.

The policy change was prompted by lawsuits and attempts to be more inclusive. Atheist parents sued the Boy Scouts of America in 1991 for denying membership in the Cub Scouts to their sons. Considering this news, the Totem Girl Scout Council of Seattle attempted to change the Girl Scout Promise to make mention of "God" optional, which would be more inclusive of local non-theist Native American and Southeast Asian girls. After the national organization asserted this could not be changed locally, the Seattle council advocated that the change be adopted nation-wide. In November 1992, the parents of Nitzya Cuevas-Macias sued for their daughter to be permitted to participate in the Girl Scouts even though she refused to promise to serve God.

On October 23, 1993, at the Girl Scouts of the USA annual national convention, delegates voted 1,560 "yes" against 375 "no" to permit individuals to substitute another word or phrase for "God" in their promise. The convention gave this explanation:

This policy change settled the Cuevas-Macias lawsuit.

Some consider that the Girl Scouts of the USA have not gone far enough in making Scouting open to non-theists; others that they have gone too far in removing God or that they are violating the constitution of the WAGGGS. In 2017, some parents still find the perceived religious aspects of the Girl Scouts enough of a reason not to sign up their daughters to participate. The WAGGGS constitution requires member societies to maintain membership standards to include a promise similar to the one established by Baden-Powell, which includes the concept of duty to God. The GSUSA policy adopted in 1993 led to the 1995 formation of an alternative organization, the American Heritage Girls that accepts only leaders and chartering organizations that agree with a specific Christian statement of faith. The organization had a little over 5,000 members in 2006. According to the organization, membership as of 2017 is over 43,000.

Prayer at meetings
The official Girl Scout policy does not ban or require prayer.

Religious pin

Girl Scouts of the USA has an optional "My Promise, My Faith" pin which girls in all grades may earn. Girls may also do religious recognition programs and wear the resulting emblem on their uniform; however, these are created and administered by the religious organizations and not by the Girl Scouts directly.

Sexuality and gender issues
Girl Scouts of the USA stated in an October 1991 letter:

GSUSA upholds a "don't ask, don't evangelize" policy on sexuality. The debate over this issue is split between those who feel that the policy should avoid and prevent discrimination on the grounds of sexual orientation, and those who question the inclusion of lesbians.

In October 2011, the Girl Scouts of Colorado council publicly stated, "If a child identifies as a girl and the child's family presents her as a girl, Girl Scouts of Colorado welcomes her as a Girl Scout", when overturning a local troop's rejection of a seven-year-old transgender girl. In July 2015, the Girl Scouts of Western Washington returned a $100,000 donation after the donor stipulated that the money could not be used to support services for transgender Scouts. The group then set up an online fundraising campaign to recoup the lost funds, ultimately raising $250,000.

In January 2012, a teen in California created a video calling for the boycott of Girl Scout Cookies in response to the Girl Scouts' policy of inclusion for transgender girls. The viral video became a rallying cry for both supporters and opponents of the group's stance on transgender members. In February 2016, Robert James Carlson, the Roman Catholic archbishop of St. Louis, urged parishioners to cut ties with the Girl Scouts over the group's embrace of LGBT rights.

The Girl Scouts themselves defended their actions against this. "For 100 years, Girl Scouts has prided itself on being an inclusive organization serving girls from all walks of life. We handle cases involving transgender children on a case-by-case basis, with a focus on ensuring the welfare and best interests of the child in question and the other girls in the troop as our highest priority."

Local objections to sex education sponsored by Planned Parenthood in Waco, Texas
GSUSA is not aligned with and does not endorse, at the national level, the reproductive health organization Planned Parenthood; Girl Scout councils may choose to have or not have connections with Planned Parenthood. In 2003, in Waco, Texas, the local Bluebonnet Council was listed as a co-sponsor, with the Girl Scouts logo printed on the promotional flyer, of the Planned Parenthood of Central Texas event titled "Nobody's Fool '03: Dating, Love, Sex & HIV." In 2004, the same Council promoted a Planned Parenthood education event without providing money nor sending Girl Scouts to it. This was criticized by some anti-abortion movement supporters and social conservatives, resulting in a local attempt to boycott Girl Scout cookies sold by the Bluebonnet Council. Waco residents responded to the announced boycott by purchasing a record amount of cookies, and the Bluebonnet Council dropped promotion of the event. A month later, GSUSA CEO Kathy Cloninger went on NBC's Today show, defending the Bluebonnet Council's decision to sever ties with Planned Parenthood.

The Radical Brownies 
In 2014, Marilyn Hollinquest and Anayvette Martinez, both women of color, founded the Radical Brownies, a community group for girls of color in Oakland, California. Similar to the GSUSA, but created specifically for girls of color, the Radical Brownies endeavors to "empower and encourage" girls of color and cultivate sisterhood and community bonds between them. 

According to the Radical Brownies' mission statement at the time of its founding, its aim was to empower young girls of color to "step into their collective power" and to make the world a more "radical" place. The Radical Brownies wear brown berets and vests in homage to the Brown Berets and Black Panther movements. The group's members, ages 8-12 years old, can earn badges in "radical beauty," "food justice," and "radical self-love."

Name controversy 
In February 2015, despite Radical Brownies co-founder Hollinquest clarifying that the group claimed no affiliation with the GSUSA, the GSUSA contacted the Radical Brownies organization and informed them that their troop's name and uniforms caused "some confusion" among GSUSA membership. According to GSUSA Chief Communications Officer Kelly Parisi, once the founders of the Radical Brownies were notified of the misunderstanding, they offered to change the group's name.

In May that same year, the Radical Brownies renamed themselves the Radical Monarchs.

Presidents

 Juliette Gordon Low (1915–1920)
 Anne Hyde Choate (1920–1922)
 Lou Henry Hoover (1922–1925) (1935–1937)
 Sarah Louise Arnold (1925–1943) (first Dean of Simmons College, 1902–1921)
 Mira Hoffman (1926?–1930) (Mrs. William H. Hoffman)
 Birdsall Otis Edey (1930–1935) (Mrs. Frederick Edey) (after ceasing to be president she became National Commissioner for the Girl Scouts until her death in 1940)
 Henrietta Bates Brooke (1937?–1939) (Mrs. Frederick H. Brooke) (died 1967, her husband was the architect Frederick H. Brooke who designed the District of Columbia War Memorial)
 Mildred Mudd (1939–1941) (she later supported the founding of Harvey Mudd College named after her husband, Harvey Seeley Mudd)
 Helen Means (1941–1945) (Mrs. Alan H. Means) Later chairwoman of the World Board (WAGGGS) (1952–1957)
 Harriet Rankin Ferguson (1946–1951) (Mrs. Vaughan C. Ferguson)
 Olivia Cameron Higgins Layton (1951–1957) (Mrs. Roy F. Layton) (died 1975)
 Marjorie Mehne Culmer (1958–1963) (Mrs. Charles U. Culmer) (later chair of WAGGGS, died in 1994)
 Margaret W. Price (1963–1969) (Mrs. Holton R. Price Jr.) (died in 1973)
 Grace M. S. McKittrick MacNeil (1969–1972) (Mrs. Douglas H. MacNeil) (died in 2000)
 Marjorie Motch (1972-1975)
 Gloria Randle Scott (1975–1978)
 Jane C. Shields Freeman (1978–1984) (her husband is Orville Freeman)
 Betty Fuller Pilsbury (1984–1990), she received the Silver Buffalo Award in 1986.
 B. LaRae Orullian (1990–1996)
 Elinor Johnstone Ferdon (1996–1999)
 Connie L. Matsui (1999–2002)
 Cynthia B. Thompson (2002–2005)
 Patricia Diaz Dennis (2005–2008)
 Connie L. Lindsey (2008–2013)
 Kathy Hopinkah Hannan (2014–2020)
Karen P. Layng (2020–present)

Chief executive officers 
The title has changed over the years.

National Secretaries:
 Edith D. Johnston (June 1913 – June 1914)
 Cora Neal (June 1914 – June 1916)
 Montague Gammon (June 1916 – August 1917)

National Directors:
 Abby Porter Leland (August 1917 – February 1919)
 Jane Deeter Rippin (February 1919 – November 1930)
 Josephine Schain (November 1930 – September 1935)
 Constance Rittenhouse (September 1935 – December 1950)

National Executive Directors:
 Dorothy C. Stratton (December 1950 – July 1960)
 Sally Stickney Cortner (July 1960 – May 1961) (Interim)
 Louise A. Wood (May 1961 – April 1972)
 Dr. Cecily Cannan Selby (April 1972 – September 1975)
 Frank H. Kanis (September 1975 – July 1976) (Interim)
 Frances Hesselbein (July 1976 – February 1990) was awarded the Presidential Medal of Freedom in 1998 in part for her work in Girl Scouts.
 Mary Rose Main (February 1990 – October 1997)
 Joel E. Becker (October 1997 – January 1998) (Interim)
 Marsha Johnson Evans (January 1998 – July 2002): retired rear admiral, left the Girl Scouts to become president of the American Red Cross

Chief Executive Officers:
 Jackie Barnes (July 2002 – October 2003) (Interim)
 Kathy Cloninger (October 2003 – November 2011)
 Anna Maria Chávez (November 2011 – June 2016)
 Sylvia Acevedo (July 2016 – August 2020) (Served in interim capacity from July 2016 – May 2017)
 Judith Batty (August 16, 2020 – January 27, 2022) (Interim) 
 Sofia Chang (January 27, 2022 - Present)

100th anniversary
GSUSA celebrated the 100th anniversary of its founding by Juliette Low with a "Bridge to the Second Century" event on November 13, 2011, at the GS National Convention in Houston and other sites around the country. The Anniversary was also celebrated by participation in the world-famous Pasadena, California Tournament of Roses Parade of 2012, featuring the Girl Scouts 100th Anniversary float, which was designed and decorated by Girl Scouts.

US President Barack Obama signed the "Girl Scouts of the USA Commemorative Coin Act" for the 100th Anniversary celebration. The act authorized the minting of 350,000 silver dollar coins in honor of Girl Scouts and the achievements of the 50 million women influenced by Girl Scouting during the last 100 years.

Colorado staged a vigorous campaign to create a special license plate to honor the Girl Scout Centennial. The Girl Scouts of Minnesota and Wisconsin River Valleys hosted "The Great Girl Gathering", a Centennial Celebration on March 10 and 11, 2012 for 140,000 girls at the Mall of America in Bloomington, Minnesota.

Build-A-Bear Workshop had a limited edition Girl Scout bear and outfits for the 100th anniversary.

The Girl Scout Council of the Nation's Capital in Washington, DC hosted a 100th Anniversary Sing-Along on the National Mall, on June 9, 2012 called Girl Scouts Rock the Mall: 100th Anniversary Sing-Along. The Rock the Mall event drew more than 200,000 people to the national mall to celebrate Girl Scouting and cost $2 million.

Girl Scouts of Citrus, in partnership with Walt Disney World, held a special 100th anniversary bridging event on May 25–28, 2012. The Bridging into the Next Century event provides Girl Scouts from all over the country an opportunity to celebrate the spirit of Girl Scouting at Epcot.

Cincinnati Museum Center held a day time and over night event to celebrate in partnership with the Girl Scouts of Western Ohio, who Ohio designed an exhibit, which was on display for free until May 13, 2012. The exhibit displays old uniforms, literature and discussed the role of the Girl Scouts for the last 100 years.

GSUSA made a new cookie called Savannah Smiles to commemorate the anniversary.

The Girl Scouts of Northeast Texas hosted the Girl Scouts national exhibition at the 2012 State Fair of Texas in the historic Hall of State. At the State Fair of Texas, visitors were able to indulge on a Fried Samoa, be part of a virtual campfire, walk through a life - sized cookie box and see a replica of Juliette Gordon Low's house.

In Savannah, Georgia where Girl Scouting was founded, they hosted a "Party in the Park" in Forsyth Park where there was a Centennial Honor Guard consisting of girls wearing vintage uniforms from the Girl Scout First Headquarters. The uniforms were;
1912 (replica)
1914
1928
1940s
1960s
1970s
1980s
and the current.

The city of Savannah closed part of the Talmadge Bridge so girls could walk the bridge and "Bridge to the next century."
Savannah also had a "Sunrise Service" with the CEO, Anna Maria Chavez. The Honor guard from the park carried the Eternal Flame.

The city of Savannah dedicated their annual "Georgia Day" to Juliette.

Similar organizations

Camp Fire Girls was founded in 1910, two years prior to the Girl Scouts, by some of the creators of the Boy Scouts of America. In 1975, the group became co-educational and soon afterwards changed its name to "Camp Fire Boys and Girls". The name was changed to Camp Fire USA in 2001 and to Camp Fire in 2012. As of 2009, the group has a membership of about 750,000.

Various religious groups have established their own youth clubs such as Missionettes (now Mpact Girls) for the Assemblies of God. Little Flowers Girls' Club is a Catholic-focused girls club. GEMS Girls' Clubs is a non-denominational group with a Calvinist/Reformed background. Pioneer Girls started as a Methodist group but is non-denominational. The Masonic Lodge which requires belief in a Supreme Being has their own set of service organizations targeted at young and teenage girls, The International Order of the Rainbow for Girls and Job's Daughters International.

One youth group explicitly set up as a Christian alternative to the Girl Scouts is the American Heritage Girls (AHG), started in 1995 in West Chester, Ohio, by a group of parents upset with available female Scouting organizations. AHG is a Christian organization that states that it is "a nonprofit organization dedicated to the mission of building women of integrity through service to God, family, community and country." As of 2020 it claims a membership (adult and youth) of over 50,000.

See also

Explanatory notes

References

Further reading

External links

 
 Girl Scout Uniform, ca. 1917, in the Staten Island Historical Society Online Collections Database
 Juliette Gordon Low Birthplace
 
 
 
 All Things Girl Scouts

 
.
1912 establishments in the United States
AmeriCorps organizations
Patriotic and national organizations chartered by the United States Congress
Women's organizations based in the United States
World Association of Girl Guides and Girl Scouts member organizations
Youth organizations based in the United States
Youth organizations established in 1912